Denis Ssebuggwawo (1870-25 May 1886) is a Ugandan Catholic martyr and saint. He was born at Kigoloba in Bulemeezi County. His father was Kajansi and mother was Nsonga of Musoga. Shortly after his birth, his grandfather was put to death and his father moved his family to their family estate at Bunono in Busiro County. Ssebuggwawo belonged to the Musu Clan.

Ssebuggwawo and his twin brother Kato became catechumens and were instructed by Saint Joseph Mukasa Balikuddembe. He was baptized on 16 November 1885 by Père Simon Lourdel, M.Afr., also known as Fr. Mapera, and he took the name Denis as his Christian name.

He was a page of Kabaka Muteesa I of Buganda and a page in personal attendance of Kabaka Mwanga II of Buganda. He was tortured and speared by King Mwanga II, for teaching his faith to Mwafu, the chancellor's son and favourite of Kabaka Mwanga, before handing him over to executioner Mpinga Kaloke on the evening of 25 May 1886. On the morning of 26 May 1886, Mpinga ordered his two men, Matembe and Mulyowa, to hack the body of the boy into pieces. Ssebuggwawo was first beheaded before he was hacked into pieces at Munyonyo. He is remembered as the first of the Martyrs of Uganda.

References

External links
 Biography of Denis Sebugwawo
 
 “Saint Denis Ssebuggwawo“. CatholicSaints.Info. 9 June 2017. Web. 24 December 2018.

1870 births
1886 deaths
19th-century Christian saints
19th-century executions by Uganda
19th-century Roman Catholic martyrs
Roman Catholic child saints
Converts to Roman Catholicism from pagan religions
Executed children
Executed Ugandan people
People executed by Buganda
Ugandan Roman Catholic saints
Christian martyrs executed by decapitation
People executed by Uganda by decapitation